Parasemionotiformes is an extinct order of neopterygian ray-finned fish that existed globally during the Triassic period. It comprises the families Parasemionotidae and Promecosominidae. Many of the included genera are monotypic and most species lived during the Early Triassic epoch.

Parasemionotiforms were normally small to medium-sized fishes. They were predominantly marine.

Evolutionary relationships
Parasemionotiformes are neopterygians, which is the clade that encompasses the vast majority of living ray-finned fishes (Actinopterygii) and about half of all living species of vertebrates. Neopterygii are divided into Teleostei and Holostei. The latter represents a depauperate group today but used to be a diverse clade especially during the Mesozoic Era. The only surviving members of the Holostei are the gars (Ginglymodi) and the bowfin (Halecomorphi).

Parasemionotiformes belong to Holostei and are one of the earliest clades of the Halecomorphi (bowfin and its extinct relatives). Parasemionotiformes are the sister group to all other halecomorphs according to cladistic analyses. 

The following tree summarizes the evolutionary relationships of the Parasemionotiformes. Names accompanied by a dagger (†) represent extinct groups.

Classification

 Order Parasemionotiformes Lehman, 1966
 Family incertae sedis
 Genus Peia Ji, 2009
 Peia jurongensis Ji, 2009 (type species)
 Family Parasemionotidae Stensiö, 1932 (= Ospiidae Stensiö, 1932)
 Genus Parasemionotus Piveteau, 1929
 Parasemionotus labordei (Priem, 1924) (type species)
 Parasemionotus besairiei Lehman et al., 1959
 Genus Ospia Stensiö, 1932
 Ospia whitei Stensiö, 1932 (type species)
 Genus Broughia Stensiö, 1932
 Broughia perleididoides Stensiö, 1932 (type species)
 Genus Watsonulus Brough, 1939 (= Watsonia Piveteau, 1934)
 Watsonulus eugnathoides (Piveteau, 1934) (type species)
 Genus Stensionotus Lehman, 1952
 Stensionotus intercessus  Lehman, 1952 (type species)
 Stensionotus dongchangensis Liu et al., 2002
 Genus Jacobulus Lehman, 1952 
 Jacobulus novus  Lehman, 1952 (type species)
 Genus Thomasinotus Lehman, 1952 
 Thomasinotus divisus Lehman, 1952 (type species)
 Genus Albertonia Gardiner, 1966 
 Albertonia cupidinia (Lambe, 1916) (type species)
 Genus Lehmanotus Beltan, 1968 
 Lehmanotus markubai Beltan, 1968 (type species)
 Genus Devillersia Beltan, 1968 
 Devillersia madagascariensis  Beltan, 1968 (type species)
 Genus Piveteaunotus Beltan, 1968 
 Piveteaunotus ifasiensis Beltan, 1968 (type species)
 Genus Icarealcyon Beltan, 1980 
 Icarealcyon malagasium Beltan, 1980 (type species)
 Genus Jurongia Liu et al., 2002
 Jurongia fusiformis Liu et al., 2002 (type species)
 Genus Qingshania Liu et al., 2002
 Qingshania cercida Liu et al., 2002 (type species)
 Genus Suius Liu et al., 2002
 Suius brevis Liu et al., 2002 (type species)
 Genus Candelarialepis Romano et al., 2019
 Candelarialepis argentus Romano et al., 2019 (type species)
 Family Promecosominidae Wade, 1940
 Genus Promecosomina Wade, 1935
 Promecosomina formosa  (Woodward, 1890) (type species) (= P. beaconensis Wade, 1935)

See also

 List of prehistoric bony fish genera

References

 
Early Triassic fish
Prehistoric fish orders